Christian Flor (162628 September 1697) was a German composer and organist. Working at churches in Rendsburg and Lüneburg, he was widely known for vocal and organ compositions. He composed one of the earliest Passion oratorios, in 1667.

Life 
Born in Neukirchen, Ostholstein, Flor came from a family of pastors spread throughout Schleswig-Holstein and was born as the son of the pastor Otto Flor and his wife Catharina. He probably received his musical education in Hamburg and Lübeck, studying with Heinrich Scheidemann and Franz Tunder. In 1653 he married Margarethe Hudemann, the widow of his predecessor. Their daughter Catharina was baptised in Rendsburg on 24 October 1653. After the death of his first wife he married Anna Dorothea Lange (1641–1685). From 1676 until his death, he was (as a predecessor of Georg Böhm) also organist at St. Johannis, the major church in Lüneburg.

Flor was widely known as an organist and organ expert. He contributed significantly to Lüneburg becoming one of the most important North German music centres of the time. Like their father, his son Johann Georg (1679–1728) worked as organist at St. Lamberti in Lüneburg, and his son Gottfried Philipp (1682–1723) from 1707 was organist at St. Michaelis, Lüneburg. Flor composed a St. Matthew Passion in 1667, which is one of the first passion oratorios in music history. He included chorales in the Passion. In addition to his few surviving organ works and independent harpsichord compositions, Flor also created several collections of occasional music and liturgical vocal works.

Flor died in Neukirchen near Eutin.

Legacy 
Johann Sebastian Bach probably became acquainted with compositions by Flor during his stay as a student in Lüneburg and may have been influenced by them. According to other sources, Bach is said to have known Flor personally and to have appreciated his compositions. His reputation is also supported by the fact that both Johann Gottfried Walther (1732) and Johann Mattheson wrote about him in their music encyclopaedias. The latter described him in his 1740 Grundlage einer Ehrenpforte as "berühmten Lüneburgischen Organisten" (famous Lüneburg organist).

Work 
Flor's works include:
 Passion oratorio, 1667
 Es ist gnug, Herr, kleines geistliches Konzert, Verlag C. Hofius Ammerbuch, 2007
 Machet die Tore weit, cantata (SATB, strings and b.c.), Edition Baroque Bremen
 Pastores currite in Bethlehem, cantata, Edition Baroque Bremen
 Es segne dich der Gott Israels, cantata, Edition Baroque Bremen
 Harpsichord works (could only be assigned to Flor in 1997), including
 Wie schön leuchtet der Morgenstern (Online-Version; PDF; 76 KB)
 Zehn Suiten für Clavier, edited by Jörg Jacobi, Edition Baroque Bremen 2006, ISMN-M-700266-05-9.
 Dreizehn & Ein Choral, Edition Baroque Bremen.
 with Johann Rist: Neues Musikalisches Seelenparadis (Old Testament), 1660
 with Rist: Neues Musikalisches Seelenparadis (New Testament), 1662
 Das gläubige Senffkorn – 23 Lieder für Singstimme und Basso continuo nach Gedichten von Georg Heinrich Werbern, 1665 (Vocal works, vol. VIII), Edition Baroque Bremen.
 Organ works: 2 Prealudia und eine Fuge in d, Choralprelude: Ein feste Burg "für 2 Claviere" , Auf Meinen Lieben Gott (With double inverted counterpoint)

The title page of the collection of settings of Biblical verses from the Old Testament bears the title:

Recordings 
 Nicolaus Bruhns: Complete Organ Works, including Christian Flor: Chorale preludes, Sven-Ingvart Mikkelsen at the Havgaard Rasmussen Organs in Eckernförde and Husum (Kontrapunkt 32198)
 G. A. Pandolfi Mealli: Violin Sonatas (1660) and Harpsichord Suites by Christian Flor, with Andrew Manze (violin) (CCS 5894)
 Dansk Orgelmusik i 400 år, including chorale prelude on "Ein feste Burg ist unser Gott" and Suite in D, Mikkelsen, 3-CD-CLASSCD528-30
 Organ Landscape: Holstein-Lübeck, including Flor's "Ein feste Burg", Wolfgang Baumgratz (organ), MDG – 319 0962(CD)
 Musicalische Frühlings-Früchte by anonymus, Dietrich Becker, Christian Flor (harpsichord suites, Hochzeitlicher Freuden-Klang) – Musica Poetica, Jörn Boysen (Challenge Classics)

References

Further reading 
 Peter Epstein: Ein unbekanntes Passionsoratorium von Christian Flor (1667). In Bach-Jahrbuch. 27, 1930, .
 Joachim Kremer, Friedrich Jekutsch, Arndt Schnoor (ed.): Christian Flor (1626–1697) – Johann Abraham Peter Schulz (1747–1800). Texte und Dokumente zur Musikgeschichte Lüneburgs.  (Veröffentlichungen der Ratsbücherei Lüneburg, vol. 6; Musik der frühen Neuzeit, vol. 2). Von Bockel, Hamburg 1997, including, among others:
 Friedrich Jekutsch: Ausstellungskatalog Christian Flor [zur Ausstellung 1997 in Lüneburg]. .
 Joachim Kremer: Der "kunstbemühte Meister". Christian Flor als Liedkomponist Johann Rists. .
 Joachim Kremer: "... tanzet, springet in die Wette ..." Über Christian Flors Vokalkompositionen. .
 Arndt Schnoor: Christian Flor und das Lüneburger Musikleben seiner Zeit [with list of works]. .
 Arndt Schnoor: Christian Flors Werke für Tasteninstrumente. .
 Arndt Schnorr: Zum Nachwirken Christian Flors. .
 Hilde Szwerinski: Verzeichnis der erhaltenen und nachweisbaren Werke Christian Flors sowie der von ihm aufgezeichneten Kompositionen. .
 Arndt Schnoor: Recently discovered cembalo works by Christian Flor, 1626–1697 [in German]. In Musikforschung. 50/1, January–March 1997, .
 Hilde Szwerinski: Flor, Christian. In Biographisches Lexikon für Schleswig-Holstein und Lübeck. Vol. 7, Wachholtz, Neumünster 1985, .
 Stephen Rose: A Lübeck music auction, 1695. In Schütz-Jahrbuch. 30, 2008, .

External links 
 
 
 
 
 Christian Flor (Composer) Bach Cantatas Website
  Christian Flor + Gregor Zuber + Johann Theile Seelen-Music / Sacred Concertos musik-sammler.de
 Christian Flor, Dietrich Becker: Northern German Dance Suites From The 17th Century arkivmusic.com
 Stellwagen-Orgel zu St. Marien, Stralsund / Die Norddeutsche Orgelkunst – Vol. 4 / Lüneburg ohscatalog.org
 Friedhelm Flamme / Discography (in German) friedhelmflamme.org
 Ein feste Burg : Orgelbearbeitungen aus 6 Jahrhunderten searchworks.stanford.edu

Organists and composers in the North German tradition
17th-century German composers
German classical organists
1626 births
1697 deaths
People from Ostholstein